The Historia de omnibus Gothorum Sueonumque regibus (The history of all Geatish and Swedish kings) is a posthumously published, partly pseudo-historical work by Johannes Magnus, Sweden's last Catholic archbishop. In 1554 (ten years after his death) it was published in Latin by his brother Olaus Magnus.

The Historia was implicitly critical of King Gustav Vasa, who had introduced the Protestant Reformation in 1527 and caused the exile of Johannes Magnus. It was nevertheless used widely by Gustav Vasa's sons and successors, to whom it had been dedicated, since it extolled the glorious past of the Swedish kingdom. In particular, the sons used the (fictitious) king-list which began with Magog, grandson of Noah. As a consequence, Eric XIV and Charles IX adopted much higher regnal numbers than warranted by the historical sources. A Swedish translation was published by Ericus Benedicti Schroderus in 1620. A modern Swedish version, translated by Kurt Johannesson and with comments by Johannesson and Hans Helander, was published in 2018 by Michaelisgillet and the Royal Swedish Academy of Letters, History and Antiquities.

Content

Book One 

The book opens up with the creation of the world, around 3960 years before the birth of Christ. Noah sets up his three sons Shem, Ham, and Japheth to govern Asia, Africa, and Europe, respectively. Citing Flavius Josephus, Johannes says that a son of Japheth, Magog, is the father of the Scythian peoples (which Johannes identifies as the Goths and in turn the Geats), and at first rules over “that part of European Scythia now called Finland”. Eighty-eight years after the Deluge, however, Magog and a great number of people cross the Baltic Sea and reach Götaland on the Scandinavian peninsula, which Magog settles and makes his new seat of power, thus becoming the first King of Sweden. This assertion, Johannes explains, is supported by “our fatherland's most reliable chronicles”.

Of Magog's five sons, Suenno and Gethar are set up to rule over (and give their names to) the Swedes and Geats, respectively, while the younger brothers Thor, German, and Ubbo help administer their brother's domains. When Suenno dies around 246 years after the flood, Ubbo becomes ruler of the Swedes, and he builds the city of Uppsala to be his seat of power, its etymology being the Halls of Ubbo. Ubbo is succeeded by Siggo I, who builds the city of Sigtuna by Lake Mälaren as a fortress against the Estonians, Finns, and “other peoples in the East”. Already by this point, the runic alphabet has been invented, which Johannes claims are older than both the Greek and Latin alphabets.

While Siggo rules over the Swedes, a man named Eric has been elected King of the Geats. Johannes describes Eric as a man who became renowned for his "good customs" and his "love for the Fatherland", and reproduces a song about the King which he claims dates back from the oldest of times, though latter-day scholars believe it more likely to be a composition of Johannes himself. Already by this point, the Geatish population has grown to such an extent that the Scandinavian peninsula can no longer support them, and to solve this problem, Eric expels all rebels in his realm to isles in the west, where they become the Danes.

After Eric's death in around 425 years after the Deluge, the Golden Age quickly comes to an end, and the Scandinavian peoples soon are converted to paganism. The temple at Uppsala is constructed, “built in such grandeur that all in its walls, roofs, and pillars seemed to be shining of purest gold”. Drawing on Saxo Grammaticus, Johannes gives a brief description of the gods in Norse mythology, which he says are related to the gods of the Roman religion. Over the next four hundred years, the amicable relations between Swedes and Geats deteriorate, and Johannes mentions the kings Uddo, Alo, Odin, Charles, Björn, and Gethar as rulers, of whom he writes that no knowledge has survived, save their names.

Identifying as he does the Geats with the Goths, the author now starts drawing on the Getica of Jordanes, and declares that in around 836 years after the Deluge, Berig, a mythical king of the Goths from the aforementioned work, is unanimously elected king by both the Swedes and the Geats, reuniting the two peoples. Concerned about how Finns, Curonians, and Ulmerugians have been raiding Sweden, Berig rallies the people for a war of conquest against the tribes across the Baltic Sea to seek vengeance and to regain the national honour. Appointing his eldest son Humulphus to rule in his absence, Berig assembles a mighty fleet and sails to the isle called Gothiscandza by Jordanes, which Johannes identifies as Gotland. From thence, they proceed to invade the land of the Ulmerugians, which Johannes identifies as the territory which would later become Prussia. Though the Ulmerguians put up a brave fight, they eventually realize that their forces are inferior to those of the Geats, and so burn their homes and fields and flee into "inner Vandalia". Though the land now is desolate, the Geats nonetheless colonizes it, as well as the neighbouring provinces of Pomerania, Poland, and Mecklenburg.
Johannes goes on to invent a list of rulers with six Erics before Eric the Victorious and six Charles before Charles VII. In that way the 16th-century monarchs Eric XIV and Charles IX could boast with ordinal numbers on par with the popes. These fictitious rulers were usually described in positive terms, but the invented King Gostagus (Ostanus, Östen III, number 90 in the list) is referred as a tyrant: "There was hardly a night throughout the year with him abstaining from fornication, rape, incest and the filthiest sexual intercourse". The account of Gostagus contains hateful hints about Gustav Vasa. The strongly patriotic work also displays strong antipathy towards Denmark.

List of Swedish monarchs appearing in the Historia 

The list includes various rulers from the Hervarar and Ynglinga saga as well as several legendary Nordic and Gothic heroes, albeit in different chronological order. All pre-12th century dates the are approximates, as stated throughout the book.

References

Sources 

 Historia de omnibus Gothorum Sveonumque regibus in Internet Archive
 Historia de omnibus Gothorum Sveonumque regibus in Litteraturbanken
 Historia de omnibus Gothorum Sveonumque regibus in Libris (Swedish Digital Library)
 Swedish translation (2018) in Litteraturbanken

1554 books
Historiography of Sweden
 
 
Gog and Magog